Philip T. Timms (September 16, 1874 – August 8, 1973) was a Canadian photographer and printer.

As an amateur he was involved in archaeology, history, music, and film. He was a member of the Royal Photographic Society and the official photographer of the Vancouver Museum. Major J.S. Matthews stated he "is a real Vancouver pioneer; handpicked, extra special, double refined and forty over proof" and Maclean's Guide to Vancouver described his works as an "invaluable contribution to our cultural heritage".

Timms became a vegetarian at the of age 27 after visiting a slaughterhouse. He advocated for animal welfare and was a member of the Anti-Vivisection Society and the SPCA. He was secretary of the Vancouver Vegetarian Society.

References

1874 births
1973 deaths
Anti-vivisectionists
Canadian photographers